Genecology is a branch of ecology which studies genetic variation of species and communities compared to their population distribution in a particular environment. It is closely related to ecogenetics, but genecology focuses primarily on an ecological perspective, looking at changes and interactions between species, while ecogenetics focuses more on species' genetic responses to the environment.

See also 
 Ecogenetics
 Race (biology)

References

Genetic genealogy
Population genetics